The Serpent's Star is an interactive fiction game with graphics. It was developed by Ultrasoft and published by Broderbund for the Apple II in 1983 as the sequel to The Mask of the Sun. Ports to the Atari 8-bit family (1984) and Commodore 64 (1985) followed.

Gameplay 

The game takes place in Tibet. The player named Mac Steele is an archaeologist, who tries to find a valuable diamond called "The Serpent's Star". He needs 13 scrolls, which provide advice to the diamond's hideout in the town of Kara-Koram. Therefore, Mac Steele has to travel through Tibet, to solve a lot of puzzles and to meet other non-player characters, e.g. Buddhist monks.

The single-player adventure is controlled via typed keyboard commands. Words and simple sentences are entered in a text parser.

Reception 
Softline stated, "if you liked Mask of the Sun, you'll probably like Serpent's Star. Most of us did". Antic called it "a good, challenging game". A reviewer for German magazine Happy Computer praised the thrilling, atmospheric storyline, the complexity of the riddles, and the graphics.

References

External links 
 Museum of Computer Adventure Game History

1983 video games
Adventure games
Apple II games
Atari 8-bit family games
Broderbund games
Commodore 64 games
Single-player video games
Ultrasoft games
Video games developed in the United States